The 2011 Continental Indoor Football League season was the league's sixth overall season. The regular season started on Saturday, February 26, with the expansion Port Huron Predators defeating the expansion Indianapolis Enforcers 69-12, and ended with the 2011 CIFL Championship Game on June 11, 2011, at the Cincinnati Gardens in Cincinnati, Ohio, where the Cincinnati Commandos defeated the Marion Blue Racers 44-29 to clinch their second consecutive CIFL Championship.

In 2011, the league saw its size stay the same for the first time. There were changes to the teams that made up the 6 teams, as Fort Wayne FireHawks, Marion Mayhem and the Wisconsin Wolfpack folded following the 2010 season, and the Chicago Cardinals changed their name to the Chicago Knights, and the Miami Valley Silverbacks established a home arena in Dayton, Ohio and changed their names to the Dayton Silverbacks. The CIFL awarded the Indianapolis Enforcers, the Marion Blue Racers and the Port Huron Predators expansion franchises.

On April 29, 2011 it was announced that the Port Huron Predators would ceased operations immediately. This made the league finish with 5 teams for a second consecutive season.

Schedule
Since the league remained at 6 teams, they stuck to their ten-game schedule for each team. Every team was scheduled to play a home and away game with every team except Indianapolis, as they were competing as a travel team.

Scheduling changes
On April 29, 2011 it was announced that the Port Huron Predators would ceased operations immediately As a result of Port Huron folding Chicago, Cincinnati, Dayton, and Indianapolis were awarded wins for their remaining games against Port Huron.

Regular season standings

y - clinched regular-season title

x - clinched playoff spot

Week 1

Indianapolis at Port Huron

Week 2

Chicago at Cincinnati

Port Huron at Marion

Indianapolis at Dayton

Week 3

Cincinnati at Marion

Week 4

Indianapolis at Cincinnati

Dayton at Port Huron

Week 5

Dayton at Marion

Week 6

Cincinnati at Dayton

Chicago at Port Huron

Indianapolis at Marion

Week 7

Port Huron at Cincinnati

Marion at Dayton

Chicago at Indianapolis

Week 8

Indianapolis at Chicago

Marion at Port Huron

Week 9

Dayton at Chicago

Week 10

Cincinnati at Dayton

Chicago at Marion

Indianapolis at Port Huron

Week 11

Indianapolis at Dayton

Cincinnati at Chicago

Week 12

Chicago at Dayton

Indianapolis at Marion

Cincinnati at Port Huron

Week 13

Indianapolis at Cincinnati

Marion at Chicago

Week 14

Marion at Cincinnati

Port Huron at Dayton

Week 15

Port Huron at Chicago

Playoffs

1 vs 4 Semifinal Game: Cincinnati Commandos at Chicago Knights

2 vs 3 Semifinal Game: vs Dayton Silverbacks at Marion Blue Racers

2011 CIFL Championship Game: Cincinnati Commandos vs. Marion Blue Racers

Media
The league launched the Gameday Center on its website that would allow followers to enjoy live stats for each game. Teams were also allowed to use local media to broadcast the teams under their own terms.

Coaching changes

Pre-season

In-season

Awards

Regular season awards
CIFL Most Valuable Player - Tyler Sheehan QB, Cincinnati Commandos
Offensive Player of the Year - Tyler Sheehan QB, Cincinnati Commandos
Defensive Player of the Year - Chris Respress DB, Dayton Silverbacks
Special Teams Player of the Year - Mike Tatum WR, Marion Blue Racers
Coach of the Year - Ryan Terry, Marion Blue Racers

Players of the week

References